Umleitung may refer to:

"Umleitung", a song by Status Quo from the album Dog of Two Head, 1971
"Umleitung", a song by Cluster from the album Sowiesoso, 1976
Umleitung, a musical group formed by Dominik Büchele
Umleitung, the German title of the 1945 film Detour